USS Procyon (AG–11) was an  in the United States Navy after World War I. She later served as a training vessel for the Merchant Marine Academy as Empire State. In 1940 the ship was returned to the United States Maritime Commission, was renamed American Pilot, and sailed under the American flag during World War II. She was scrapped in 1948.

Service history
Procyon was built in 1919 by the American International Shipbuilding Corp., Hog Island, Pennsylvania, and launched as the SS Shaume; taken over by the Navy on 8 November 1921 from the U.S. Shipping Board, under executive order of 29 October 1921; and commissioned on 30 November 1921. Procyon served as flagship of Commander Fleet Base Force, U.S. Battle Fleet, until she was decommissioned on 1 April 1931.

Inspected by the State Education Department of New York, she was found suitable for use as a Merchant Marine Academy training vessel; and, by request of Governor Franklin D. Roosevelt, she was renamed Empire State (IX-38) and turned over to the state of New York on 15 July 1931. She served as a school ship for the Academy until 11 April 1940, when she was transferred to the Maritime Commission.

The ship was renamed American Pilot and sailed under the American flag during World War II. In the third quarter of 1948, American Pilot was scrapped at Wilmington, Delaware.

References

External links

 
  Photo: S.S. American Pilot (ex USS Procyon (AG-11)) Naval History & Heritage Command - Online Library of Selected Images

 

Design 1022 ships
Hog Islanders
1919 ships
Antares-class cargo ships
World War II merchant ships of the United States